Christopher Robert Holder (born 24 September 1987 in Sydney, New South Wales) is an Australian speedway. He became the Australian Individual Speedway Champion in 2008 and followed up with wins in 2010, 2011, 2012, and 2014 (he was runner up in 2009) as well as winning the Australian Under-21 Championship in 2005, 2006, 2007 and 2008. He finished as runner-up in the Under-21 World Championship in 2007 and 2008. He was the 2012 World Speedway Champion.

Career
Chris Holder started racing in the UK with the Isle of Wight Islanders in 2006. In 2007 he rode for Atlas Wrocław  in the Polish Speedway Ekstraliga. Holder won the Swedish Allsvenskan in 2007  and the Elitserien in 2008 and 2009 with Lejonen. In 2008, Holder signed for KS Toruń in Polish Ekstraliga and won the league championship.

In October 2007, the Poole Pirates announced that Holder would ride for them in 2008 in the Elite League. Holder won the Elite League Championship, and became a league winner with all three of his domestic teams in 2008.

Holder finished second in the 2007 Junior World Championship and was also selected to ride in the Australian team for the 2007 Speedway World Cup, finishing in 3rd place. Holder again represented Australian in the 2008 Speedway World Cup.

Holder won the Australian Championship in 2008, winning all five rounds with a record maximum 100 points. He has won the Australian Under 21 Championship for four consecutive years (2005–2008), equalling a record set by Leigh Adams. In October 2008, Holder finished runner-up in the Junior World Championship for the second year in succession to Emil Saifutdinov.

After Lejonen Gislaveds relegation from Swedish Elite League Chris has changed club to Swedish champions Piraterna Motala.

Chris Holder is the reigning Australian Individual Speedway Champion having won his 5th title held over three rounds in January 2014. He won the title in his comeback from injuries suffered in a league match during the 2013 season.

In 2010 and 2012, Holder won the British Speedway Grand Prix at Cardiff's Millennium Stadium.

On 7 October 2012 Holder became Speedway World Champion, joining Lionel Van Praag (1936), Bluey Wilkinson (1938), Jack Young (1951, 1952), Jason Crump (2004, 2006, 2009), and Jason Doyle (2017 Speedway Grand Prix) as Australians who have won speedways ultimate individual prize.

Holder is the current captain of the Australian team that finished third in the 2014 Speedway World Cup Final in Poland.

After initially considering giving the 2015 Australian Championship to be held in early January a miss in order to get himself fit for the 2015 Speedway Grand Prix season, Holder decided to defend his title. Bike problems in the first round at the Gillman Speedway in Adelaide saw him only finish 7th on points with 8 and only just gain a place in the "B" Final where he finished 3rd. Things improved considerably in the second round at Olympic Park in Mildura for round 2 where he finished equal second on points before finishing second in the "A" Final to World Cup team mate and championship leader Jason Doyle. That was where his title defence ended though as a crash in practice for the third round at the Undera Park Speedway saw him hospitalised with a suspected broken wrist. However it later emerged that Holder had not broken his wrist but had dislocated it and bent a plate previously inserted requiring him to have further surgery to replace the plate and relocate his wrist.

By his own standards, the 2012 World Champion had a down on par SGP season in 2015, with his best finish being 2nd at the British SGP. After a poor showing at the Australian SGP in Melbourne where he only scored 2 points from his 5 rides, he ultimately finished 8th in the series just grabbing the last automatic qualifying spot for 2016 by 3 points from Danish rider Peter Kildemand. Following the SGP season, Holder announced that he would not be contesting the Australian season in an effort to get himself right for 2016, planning on racing only two meetings at home over the summer. In a return to form, Holder won the Solo Final at the Darcy Ward Benefit Meeting held at the Gillman Speedway on 7 November just two weeks after the Australian GP, leading home fellow Aussie SGP rider Troy Batchelor and surprising young German Kai Huckenbeck. On the night Holder also swapped two wheels for three and did 4 quick laps on the back of Mark Plaisted's 1000cc sidecar.

On 22 October 2016, Chris Holder won the Australian SGP to secure 4th place in the 2016 Speedway Grand Prix standings. Holder won the final at the Etihad Stadium from outgoing World Champion Tai Woffinden, Polish rider Bartosz Zmarzlik and Sweden's Antonio Lindbäck. It was Holder's first SGP victory since winning the 2012 British SGP. After a poor 2015 by his own standards where he made just two Finals only just finished in the top 8 of the SGP, Holder bounced back in 2016 to ride in 7 of the 11 Finals in the championship series with one win, two second and two third placings. Holder's younger brother Jack also rode in Melbourne as the second track reserve for the meeting and finished 2nd in his first ride.

Family
His brother, James Holder, also rode in the UK with the Plymouth Devils in the Premier League and younger brother Jack Holder is an World team champion.

World final appearances

Speedway World Cup
 2007 –  Leszno, Alfred Smoczyk Stadium – 3rd – 29pts (3)
 2008 –  Vojens, Speedway Center – 4th – 21pts (4)
 2009 –  Leszno, Alfred Smoczyk Stadium – 2nd – 43pts (10)
 2011 –  Gorzów Wielkopolski, Edward Jancarz Stadium – 2nd – 45pts (15)
 2012 –  Målilla, G&B Stadium – 2nd – 39pts (16)
 2014 –  Bydgoszcz, Polonia Bydgoszcz Stadium – 3rd – 36pts (11)
 2015 –  Vojens, Speedway Center – 4th – 26pts (8)
 2016 –  Manchester, National Speedway Stadium – 4th – 22pts (10)

Individual U-21 World Championship
 2006 –  Terenzano, Pista Olimpia Terenzano – 12th – 5pts
 2007 –  Ostrów Wielkopolski, Stadion Miejski – 2nd – 14pts
 2008 –  Pardubice, Svítkov Stadion – 2nd – 12+3pts

U-21 Speedway World Cup
 2008 –  Holsted – 4th – 33pts (16)

Speedway Grand Prix results

References

1987 births
Living people
Australian speedway riders
Individual Speedway World Champions
Isle of Wight Islanders riders
Poole Pirates riders
Motorcycle racers from Sydney